The  is a Japanese railway line in Fukuoka Prefecture connecting Tagawa-Gotōji Station in the city of Tagawa and Shin-Iizuka Station in the city of Iizuka. It is part of the JR Kyushu network.

Basic data
Operator, distances:
Kyushu Railway Company (JR Kyushu) (Services and tracks)
Tagawa-Gotōji – Shin-Iizuka: 
Gauge: Narrow gauge, 
Stations: 6
Double-tracking: None
Electrification: None
Railway signalling: Special automatic

Station list
 All stations are located in Fukuoka Prefecture.
 Rapid trains, which only operate in the direction of Tagawa-Gotōji, stop at stations marked "●" and pass stations marked "↑".

History

The Hōshū Railway Co. opened the central section of the line in 1897 to haul freight, the company merging with the Kyushu Railway Co. in 1901, which extended the line to Kami-Mio in 1902. That company was nationalised in 1909, and the line extended to Shin-Iizuka in 1920 with passenger services to Funao introduced at that time.

The Kyushu Industrial Railway Co. opened the Funao - Tagawa-Gotoji section in 1922 to service a cement plant. That company was nationalised in 1943, creating the current line. Passenger services were extended to Tagawa-Gotoji in 1945, and freight services ceased in 1987.

Former connecting lines
Shimo-Kamoo station -

 A 1 km line to the Asakasa coal mine operated from 1926 until 1945.
 The 8 km Urushio line to Shimo-Yamada (on the Kami-Yamada line, closed in 1986) opened between 1908 and 1913 as a freight line, with passenger services introduced in 1920. Freight services ceased in 1974, and the line closed in 1986.

References

Lines of Kyushu Railway Company
1067 mm gauge railways in Japan
Railway lines opened in 1897